The Union of Socialists (UdS) was a social-democratic political party in Italy.

The party was founded in February 1948 by Ivan Matteo Lombardo, former secretary of the Italian Socialist Party. The UdS participated in the 1948 general election as part of the Socialist Unity coalition with the Italian Socialist Workers' Party (Partito Socialista dei Lavoratori Italiani; PSLI), which collectively received 7.1% of the vote for the Chamber of Deputies and gained 33 seats. However, out of them only Lombardo and Piero Calamandrei were members of the UdS.

Lombardo was succeeded as the party's leader by Ignazio Silone in June 1949. In December of that year the UdS was dissolved into the Unitary Socialist Party (Partito Socialista Unitario; PSU), which itself subsequently merged with the PSLI to form the Italian Democratic Socialist Party (Partito Socialista Democratico Italiano; PSDI) in 1951.

References

Defunct political parties in Italy
1948 establishments in Italy
1949 disestablishments in Italy
Defunct social democratic parties in Italy
Political parties disestablished in 1949
Political parties established in 1948